This is the discography of Indian singer composer Himesh Reshammiya. He has released 6 studio albums till date, All the details below contains his work as a playback singer, composer, lyricist and actor.

Filmography

As an actor

As producer 
Reshammiya, along with his father Vipin Reshammiya, has produced and distributed films under the banner HR Musik Limited. Later in 2021, he launched his another record label, Himesh Reshammiya Melodies, to produce his music albums and in 2022, he announced his first film under this banner.

As story writer

Discography as a composer

As a background music composer

As a music director

Discography as a playback singer

Discography as a lyricist

Solo albums

Theater

Television appearances

References

External links

Himesh Reshammiya albums
Films scored by Himesh Reshammiya